The 13113 / 13114 Hazarduari Express is a Superfast Express-type train of Indian Railways connecting Kolkata with Lalgola in  Murshidabad district of West Bengal. Named after the famous Hazarduari Palace, a famous tourist destination of Murshidabad. It is a daytime train covering 223 kilometers at an average speed of 65 km/h.

Facilities 
An advance reservation period of 60 days is available for this train. Two AC chair cars, 2 Second class sitting coach, 6 general sitting coach including guard coach cum luggage break van are available in it. Pantry car service is not available in it.

Traction
Both trains are hauled by a Howrah-based WAP-5 / WAP-7 locomotive on its entire journey.

Route & Halts

Timings
 13113 Hazarduari Express leaves Kolkata Railway station at 6:50am in morning everyday and reaches Lalgola same day at 11:20am. Reaches Bhagwangola at 10:47am, Jiaganj at 10:36am, Murshidabad station at 10:27am, Berhampore Court Station at 10:14am, Plassey at 9:32am, Bethuadahari at 9:13am, Krishnanagar at 8:50am, Ranaghat at 8:20am, Barrackpore at 7:20am,
 13114 Hazarduari Express departs Lalgola at 4:30pm in afternoon via Bhagwangola (at 4:41pm), Jiaganj (4:53pm), Murshidabad(at 5:01pm), Berhampore Court (at 5:14pm), Beldanga (at 5:34pm), Plassey (at 5:50pm), Bethuadahari (at 6:13pm), Krishnanagar (at 6:56pm), Ranaghat (at 7:36pm), Barrackpore (at 8:41pm) and reaches Kolkata Railway station at 9:40pm same day.

References

Transport in Kolkata
Named passenger trains of India
Rail transport in West Bengal
Express trains in India